In 2008 and 2010, Hunan Satellite Television produced the Chinese version of 1 vs. 100, which has the same name as the Hong Kong version, called 以一敌百 (literally translated "to oppose 100 people by 1 person"). The first season was aired between March 5 and July 31, 2008 and the second season was premiered on April 15, 2010 and ended on December 23, 2010.

Game rules

The show adopts the uses the season 2 rules of the American version. The mobs of this version are called "happy answerers" (快乐答人) in season 1 and "pass keepers" (守关者) in season 2. For the new rules, the One progresses the payout ladder for every 10 Mob members eliminated in succession, given in "happy gold balls" (快乐金球), which can be used to shop in Happigo (season 1) or "gold coins" (season 2), either one of each currency equals to one Renminbi.

If the "One" answers four questions (three questions in season 1) correctly, the contestant decides on whether to leave with the accumulated winnings or risk all and continue playing; if at any point the "One" answers incorrectly, the "One" loses all of their winnings while the winnings were to split amongst any remaining Mob members. During the game, the player can use any helps:

Ask the answerers (询问答人) (Choose one from two (对错二选一) in Season 2): two Mob members are randomly selected: one who answered correctly and one who answered incorrectly. Each explains his or her decision to the contestant, which in turn eliminates the third choice from consideration.
Poll the answerers (求证答人): Appeared only on Season 1, the One selects one of the three answers to get more information about. The number of Mob members who chose that answer is revealed, and the contestant chooses one of the revealed mob members to discuss his or her response.
Trust the answerers (信任答人) (Trust the majority (信任大多数) in Season 2): the One is automatically committed to the answer chosen most frequently by the Mob.
Call for help (电话帮帮忙): Appeared on Season 2 in replacement from Poll the answerers, the One can get help by phoning a friend.

Special episodes

Season 1
Episode 9, 10, 13 and 14 uses a format similar to the "Battle of the Sexes" of the American version. All the answerers were men in episode 9 and 10, and women in episode 13 and 14.
In episode 11, the prizes were in cash and the top prize was 200,000 Renminbi. The total of 300,000 Renminbi given out in this episode were donated for rebuilding the site of 2008 Sichuan earthquake. Additionally, the format uses less than 100 Mob members with two Mob members participating as the "One", similar to the "Last Man Standing" special episode of the American version.
All the answerers in episode 12 were kids, similar to the American Season 1 episode aired February 2, 2007.
In episode 16, the season one finale, the top prize also include a car in addition to beating 100 mob members.

Season summary
 Contestant won the top prize  
 Contestant left the game with their winnings  
 Contestant was defeated and loses their winnings to remaining Mob members

List of contestants of season 1

References

External links
Official website
Season 1
Season 2
Watch all the episodes of season 1 of the show

1 vs. 100
Chinese game shows
2008 Chinese television series debuts
2010 Chinese television series endings
Chinese television series based on non-Chinese television series
Mandarin-language television shows
Hunan Television original programming